Jim & Ingrid Croce is the second studio album by American singer-songwriter Jim Croce and his wife Ingrid, released in 1969. The album has been re-released with alternate titles such as "Bombs over Puerto Rico", "Another Day, Another Town" and "Approaching Day".

Track listing

The album was re-released on Capitol Records as Jim & Ingrid Croce: Another Day Another Town, with two songs omitted and the tracks rearranged in the following order:

Personnel
Jim Croce – guitar, keyboards, vocals, 12-string guitar
Ingrid Croce – vocals
Gary Chester – drums
Harry Katzman – violin
Ann Minogue – triangle
Gene Pistilli – guitar, keyboards
John Stockfish – bass
Eric Weissberg – mandolin
Dick Weissman – banjo
Tommy West – guitar, keyboards, backing vocals

Production
Producers: Terry Cashman, Gene Pistilli, Tommy West

References

Jim Croce albums
1969 albums
Capitol Records albums
Vocal duet albums
Ingrid Croce albums
Albums produced by Terry Cashman